Jerry Leake (born June 19, 1959) is an American world percussionist, composer, author, and educator who specializes in Indian, African, Caribbean, and jazz traditions. He is experienced with flamenco, Turkish and Middle Eastern styles.

Faculty positions 
Jerry Leake is an associate professor at Berklee College of Music in Boston and has been affiliated with Berklee since 1993. He graduated with a diploma from Berklee in professional music in 1985.

Jerry is on the faculty at the New England Conservatory (since in 1991) where he teaches classes and ensembles on African music, Rhythm Skills, and World Rhythm. At NEC, he is affiliated with the Abreu Fellow Program, and the NEC Intercultural Institute.
He has been an artist-in-residence at Jacob's Pillow, Rivers Music School, and the University of Michigan in Kalamazoo.

Publications 
Relating Sound & Time
Master Drummers of West Africa
African Bell Ritual
Drum Set Adaptations of North Indian Tabla
Clave
Series A.I.M. Percussion Text
Vol. I: Afro-American Aspects
Vol. II: Indian Influence
Vol. III: Mallets, Meters & Multiple Percussion

Manuals for Drum Set 
Belrak: demonic independence
Agbekor for Solo Drum Set
Gahu for Solo Drum Set
South Indian Rhythms for Drum Set

Articles Published in PAS Magazine 
Five Steps to the Stage
Flamenco Compas for Alegrias
Modes of the African Bell
The Three Ts
3+3+2 Rhythm Structure
Harmonic Time
Jati Rhythm Scales
a-rhythm-etic
The Biology of Rhythm

Discography

As a Leader 
Cubist
Cubist Live
Mobeus
The Turning
Vibrance
Bu'ahbl

As a Co-Leader/Sideman

Natraj 
Song of the Swan
Deccan Dance
Meet Me Anywhere
The Goat Also Gallops

Club d'Elf 
So Below
Now I Understand
As Above

Ken Schaphorst Big Band 
After Blue
Making Lunch

Teachers 
North India (tabla):  Rajeev & Shreeram Devasthali, Todd Nardin, Koashal Anand
West Africa: Ewe music with Godwin Agbeli & sons, Dagomba music with Alhaji Dolsi-naa Abubakari Lunna (1991–2009); Souleymane Coulibaly of Badenya Les Frères Coulibaly, Prof. David Locke
South India (mridangam/theory): T.K. Ramakrishnan
Afro-Cuban (congas, miscellaneous percussion): Pablo Landrum, Hilary Noble
Vibraphone: Gary Burton, Ed Saindon
Self-taught: Egyptian riq, African tar, Moroccan bendir, Spanish cajón, udu drums, berimbau, Venezuelan maracas

External links 
 Rhombus Publishing

1959 births
Living people
American percussionists
American music educators